Argentina competed at the 1998 Winter Olympics in Nagano, Japan.

Alpine skiing

Women

Women's combined

Snowboarding

Men's giant slalom

References
Official Olympic Reports
 Olympic Winter Games 1998, full results by sports-reference.com

Nations at the 1998 Winter Olympics
1998
Winter Olympics